RhineStoned is the ninth studio album recorded by country music artist Pam Tillis. It is her first album for her own Stellar Cat label. The tracks "Band in the Window" and "The Hard Way" were both released as singles, although neither charted.

Kellie Pickler released a cover version of "Someone Somewhere Tonight" in May 2013, and the single peaked a number 49 on the Billboard Country Airplay charts.

Track listing
"Something Burning Out" (Leslie Satcher) – 3:25
"Band in the Window" (Lisa Brokop, Kim McLean) – 3:28
"Train Without a Whistle" (Jon Randall) – 4:27
"Life Has Sure Changed Us Around" (Pam Tillis, Gary Nicholson) – 4:18
"Someone Somewhere Tonight" (Davis Raines, Walt Wilkins) – 4:52
"Down By the Water" (Jim Armenti) – 3:47
"Crazy By Myself" (Matraca Berg, Gary Harrison) – 3:20
"Bettin' Money on Love" (Verlon Thompson, Doug Crider) – 4:42
"That Was a Heartache" (Bruce Robison, Satcher) – 3:41
"The Hard Way" (Mel Tillis Jr., P. Tillis) – 4:14
"Over My Head" (Andrew Gold, Jenny Yates) – 4:38

Personnel

 John Anderson – vocals on "Life Has Sure Changed Us Around"
 Eddie Bayers – drums, percussion
 Steve Brewster – drums, percussion
 Pat Buchanan – electric guitar, harmonica
 Sam Bush – mandolin
 Carrie April Tillis – background vocals
 J.T. Corenflos – electric guitar
 Dan Dugmore – mandolin, pedal steel guitar
 Aubrey Haynie – fiddle, mandolin
 Lona Heins – background vocals
 Wes Hightower – background vocals
 Jim Hoke – accordion, bass harmonica, clarinet, harmonica, penny whistle
 John Barlow Jarvis – Hammond B-3 organ, piano
 Mary Ann Kennedy – background vocals
 Kristen Gartner – background vocals
 Kevin McKendree – Hammond B-3 organ, harpsichord, piano
 Steve Mackey – bass guitar
 Russ Pahl – dobro, electric guitar, pedal steel guitar
 Michael Rhodes – bass guitar
 Pam Rose – background vocals
 Steve Sheehan – banjo, acoustic guitar
 Bryan Sutton – banjo, acoustic guitar, mandolin
 Mel Tillis Jr. – background vocals
 Pam Tillis – lead vocals, background vocals
 Jonathan Yudkin – fiddle, mandolin

References

2007 albums
Pam Tillis albums